Abiola Ogunbanwo (born 19 April 2004) is a Nigerian swimmer. In 2019, she represented Nigeria at the 2019 World Aquatics Championships held in Gwangju, South Korea. She competed in the women's 100 metre freestyle and women's 200 metre freestyle events. In both events she did not advance to compete in the semi-finals.

In 2018, she competed in two events at the 2018 FINA World Swimming Championships (25 m) held in Hangzhou, China. In 2021, she competed in the women's 100 metre freestyle event at the 2020 Summer Olympics held in Tokyo, Japan.

She broke the longstanding Nigerian record of 1:00.50 when she finished the 100 meters swimming with 59.74 seconds in the  2020 Summer Olympics.

References 

Living people
2004 births
Place of birth missing (living people)
Nigerian female swimmers
Nigerian female freestyle swimmers
Swimmers at the 2020 Summer Olympics
Olympic swimmers of Nigeria